Siril Verma (born 25 December 1999) is an Indian badminton player. He was the silver medalist at the 2015 World Junior Championships. He reached a career high of world no. 1 of the world junior ranking in January 2016. Verma was the gold medalists at the 2019 South Asian Games in the men's singles and team events.

Achievements

South Asian Games 
Men's singles

BWF World Junior Championships 
Boys' singles

BWF Grand Prix (1 runner-up) 
The BWF Grand Prix had two levels, the Grand Prix and Grand Prix Gold. It was a series of badminton tournaments sanctioned by the Badminton World Federation (BWF) and played between 2007 and 2017.

Men's singles

  BWF Grand Prix Gold tournament
  BWF Grand Prix tournament

BWF International Challenge/Series (2 runners-up) 
Men's singles

  BWF International Challenge tournament
  BWF International Series tournament
  BWF Future Series tournament

References

External links 
 

1999 births
Living people
Sportspeople from Bheemavaram
Racket sportspeople from Telangana
Indian male badminton players
South Asian Games gold medalists for India
South Asian Games medalists in badminton